Ab To Aaja Saajan Mere is a 1994 Indian Bollywood film produced and directed by Rakesh Nahata. It stars  Arvind Joshi and Shalini Kapoor
.

Cast
 Arvind Joshi... Mahenga
 Shailini Kapoor... Ganga
 Roma Manik... Jamuna D. Singh
 Arvind Rathod... Ramdas
 Suresh Varma... Shyamkumar 'Shyam' V. Singh

Soundtrack
"Ab To Aaja Sajan" - N/A
"Jab Tak Hai Dum" - Shabbir Kumar
"Khul Gaya Kajra" - Shabbir Kumar
"Odhni Odhu Toh" - N/A

External links

1990s Hindi-language films
1994 films
Films scored by Anand–Milind